Parastu (Persian "swallow") is a Persian girl's name and may refer to:

Parastu, an Iranian version of the Beechcraft Bonanza
old spelling of Barastu, village in Milanlu Rural District, North Khorasan 
Parastu 14 (aircraft), an Iranian trainer aircraft